The following is a list of 1997 Seattle Mariners draft picks. The Mariners took part in both the Rule 4 draft (June amateur draft) and the Rule 5 draft. The Mariners made 62 selections in the 1997 draft, the first being pitcher Ryan Anderson in the first round. In all, the Mariners selected 33 pitchers, 13 outfielders, 5 third basemen, 4 catchers, 4 shortstops, 2 second basemen, and 1 first baseman.

Draft

Key

Table

Rule 5 draft

Key

Table

References
General references

Inline citations

External links
Seattle Mariners official website